The 2021 Buckinghamshire Council election took place on 6 May 2021, alongside nationwide local elections. The election was originally due to take place in May 2020, but was postponed due to the COVID-19 pandemic.

A total of 147 councillors were elected, with the 49 wards electing 3 councillors each. In order to secure a majority, a party needed to secure 74 seats.

The Conservative Party took an overall majority with 113 seats; the Liberal Democrats came second, with 15 seats.

Background
Due to the postponement of the 2020 local elections until 2021, it was announced on 18 March 2020 that all of the current shadow authority members would become councillors and the shadow executive members would form the cabinet. They remained in post until the inaugural election took place in May 2021.

Summary

Election result

|-

Ward results

Abbey
To elect 3 councillors.

Amersham & Chesham Bois
To elect 3 councillors.

Aston Clinton & Bierton
To elect 3 councillors.

Aylesbury East
To elect 3 councillors.

Aylesbury North
To elect 3 councillors.

Aylesbury North West
To elect 3 councillors.

Aylesbury South East
To elect 3 councillors.

Aylesbury South West
To elect 3 councillors.

Aylesbury West
To elect 3 councillors.

Beaconsfield
To elect 3 councillors.

Bernwood
To elect 3 councillors.

Booker, Cressex & Castlefield
To elect 3 councillors.

Buckingham East
To elect 3 councillors.

Buckingham West
To elect 3 councillors.

Chalfont St Giles
To elect 3 councillors.

Chalfont St Peter
To elect 3 councillors.

Chesham
To elect 3 councillors.

Chess Valley
To elect 3 councillors.

Chiltern Ridges
To elect 3 councillors.

Chiltern Villages
To elect 3 councillors.

Cliveden
To elect 3 councillors.

Denham
To elect 3 councillors.

Downley
To elect 3 councillors.

Farnham Common & Burnham Beeches
To elect 3 councillors.

Flackwell Health, Little Marlow & Marlow South East
To elect 3 councillors.

Gerrards Cross
To elect 3 councillors.

Great Brickhill
To elect 3 councillors.

Great Missenden
To elect 3 councillors.

Grendon Underwood
To elect 3 councillors.

Hazlemere
To elect 3 councillors.

Iver
To elect 3 councillors.

Ivinghoe
To elect 3 councillors.

Little Chalfont & Amersham Common
To elect 3 councillors.

Marlow
To elect 3 councillors.

Penn Wood & Old Amersham
To elect 3 councillors.

Ridgeway East
To elect 3 councillors.

Ridgeway West
To elect 3 councillors.

Ryemead & Micklefield
To elect 3 councillors.

Stoke Poges & Wexham
To elect 3 councillors.

Stone & Waddesdon
To elect 3 councillors.

Terriers & Amersham Hill
To elect 3 councillors.

The Risboroughs
To elect 3 councillors.

The Wooburns, Bourne End & Hedsor
To elect 3 councillors.

Totteridge & Bowerdean
To elect 3 councillors.

Tylers Green & Loudwater
To elect 3 councillors.

Wendover, Halton & Stoke Mandeville
To elect 3 councillors.

West Wycombe
To elect 3 councillors.

Wing
To elect 3 councillors.

Winslow
To elect 3 councillors.

By-elections

Bernwood
A by-election was held on 30 June 2022 following the resignation of Cllr Cameron Branston

References

2021 English local elections
2020s in Buckinghamshire